Heteropsontus is a genus of jumping bristletails in the family Machilidae. There is one described species in Heteropsontus, H. americanus.

References

Further reading

 
 
 
 
 

Archaeognatha
Articles created by Qbugbot